The Capital District consist of public schools located East and Northeast of the James River in the Greater Richmond Region.

Capital District schools compete in the 6A, 5A, 4A, and 3A divisions.

Facts about the District
The district contained seven schools until 2003, when new Hanover High School opened. The district went back to seven schools the next year when John F. Kennedy High School merged with Armstrong High School. In 2010, the district expanded back to eight schools when newly constructed Glen Allen High School was opened. In 2015 Glen Allen High School was moved to the Colonial District for proximity reasons. Patrick Henry High School was pulled from the colonial district and placed in the capital district allowing all Hanover County Schools to compete against each other annually.

Atlee, Hanover, Patrick Henry and Mechanicsville HS are located in Hanover County. Highland Springs, Henrico, and Varina HS are located in Henrico County. Armstrong HS is located in the City of Richmond.

Member schools
Armstrong High School of Richmond, Virginia
Atlee High School of Mechanicsville, Virginia
Hanover High School of Mechanicsville, Virginia
Henrico High School of Richmond, Virginia
Highland Springs High School of Highland Springs, Virginia
Mechanicsville High School of Mechanicsville, Virginia
Varina High School of Richmond, Virginia
Patrick Henry High School of Ashland, Virginia

References

Virginia High School League